Bivian Lewis Lee Jr. (August 3, 1948 – November 14, 1984) was an American football cornerback in the National Football League. He was drafted by the New Orleans Saints in the third round of the 1971 NFL Draft. He played college football at Prairie View A&M.

Lee played quarterback at Emile High School in Bastrop, Texas. He went to Prairie View, where he still is the record-holder for 21 career interceptions. He also returned one interception 105 yards for a score.

Lee led the Saints in interceptions with four in 1972 and was tied for the team lead with three in 1973.

He died of cardiac arrhythmia, with his death providing some impetus for congressional investigations into dietary supplements.

His son, Bivian "Sonny" Lee III was honored during the 15th Annual BET Awards for his work as the founder of Son of a Saint, a 501 c 3 organization based in New Orleans which mentors boys whose fathers have been incarcerated or are dead.

References

1948 births
1984 deaths
American football cornerbacks
Prairie View A&M Panthers football players
New Orleans Saints players
Players of American football from Austin, Texas